Trafermin (brand name Fiblast), also known as recombinant human basic fibroblast growth factor (rhbFGF), is a recombinant form of human basic fibroblast growth factor (bFGF) which is marketed in Japan as a topical spray for the treatment of skin ulcers. It is also currently in preregistration for the treatment of periodontitis. As a recombinant form of bFGF, trafermin is a potent agonist of the FGFR1, FGFR2, FGFR3, and FGFR4. The drug has been marketed in Japan since June 2001.

References

External links
 Trafermin - AdisInsight

Growth factors
Human proteins
Recombinant proteins